Bhati is a census town in South district in the state of Delhi, India.

Demographics
At the 2001 India census, Bhati had a population of 15,882. Males constituted 55% of the population and females 45%. Bhati had an average literacy rate of 47%, lower than the national average of 59.5%; with male literacy of 59% and female literacy of 33%. 18% of the population was under 6 years of age.

References

Cities and towns in South Delhi district